Arniocera auriguttata is a species of moth of the family Thyrididae. It is found in South Africa.

References 

Thyrididae
Moths of Africa
Moths described in 1857